The 1996 Texas A&M–Commerce Lions football team represented Texas A&M University–Commerce—as a member of the Lone Star Conference (LSC) during the 1996 NCAA Division II football season. Led by 11th-year head coach Eddie Vowell, the Lions compiled an overall record of 7–4 with a mark of 4–3 in conference play, placing in a three-way tied for third in the LSC. The team played its home games at Memorial Stadium in Commerce, Texas. Texas A&M University–Commerce was renamed from East Texas State University after joining the Texas A&M University System in 1996.

Schedule

Postseason awards

All-Americans
Kevin Mathis, First Team 
James Epps, Third Team
Brett Bertrand, Honorable Mention

All-Lone Star Conference

LSC Superlatives
Defensive Back of the Year: Kevin Mathis

LSC First Team
Ralph Bennett, Offensive Tackle
Brett Bertrand, Defensive End
Cole Cayce, Quarterback
David Dell, Kicker
James Epps, Receiver 
Kevin Mathis, Cornerback  
Jim Suiter, Offensive Tackle

LSC Second Team
Travis Marshall, Defensive End

LSC Honorable Mention
Trey Burk, Offensive Guard
Casey Cowan, Wide Receiver 
Jason Hoffman, Center
Jermaine McDowell, Running Back
Neal Searcy, Defensive Back
Carl Wheeler, Defensive Back

References

Texas AandM-Commerce
Texas A&M–Commerce Lions football seasons
Texas AandM-Commerce Football